Jericho is a period drama series created and written by Steve Thompson and directed by Paul Whittington. The eight-part series premiered on ITV between 7 January and 25 February 2016. The series re-imagines the building of the Ribblehead Viaduct (renamed the Culverdale Viaduct) as a Western-inspired story. It is set in the fictional town of Jericho, a shanty town in the Yorkshire Dales of England, which springs up around the construction of a railway viaduct in the 1870s.

In April 2016 ITV confirmed that a second series of the show was not going to be commissioned. The series is available via streaming video in the USA on Acorn TV, beginning 11 July 2016.

Premise
The series focuses upon the shanty town of Jericho, home to a community that will live, thrive and die in the shadow of the viaduct they have been brought together to build.

Cast
Jessica Raine as Annie Quaintain, a widow with teenage children.
Hans Matheson as Johnny Jackson, a navvy.  It is discovered later in the series his real name is John Blackwood.
Tommy McDonnell as Dagger Wilkins.
Clarke Peters as Ralph Coates, a railway agent.
Mark Addy as Earl Bamford, a detective.
Dean Andrews as ‘Happy’ Jack Laggan, a navvy gang leader.
Lorraine Ashbourne as Lace Polly, a prostitute.
Amy James-Kelly as Martha Quaintain, Annie's daughter
Samuel Bottomley as George Quaintain, Annie's son
Daniel Rigby as Charles Blackwood.
Jeany Spark as Isabella Lambton.
Phil Cornwell as Joe Capstick
Elliot Barnes-Worrell as Easter

Production
Scenes were shot around Huddersfield, specifically Golcar, at the Colne Valley Museum, and on the moors above Meltham and Marsden. The main setting for the shanty town was Rockingstone Quarry. Wharncliffe Chase above Oughtibridge, north Sheffield, was another shanty town set with nearby locations being used.

Episodes

Reception
The series received mixed reviews from critics. The Guardian's Lucy Mangan, reviewing the first episode, remarked that the presentation was a bit too clean for the setting, but praised the cast and ending. Jasper Rees of The Telegraph commended the ambition, but found the first episode's drama 'busy' and the genre confused. Andrew Billen of The Times gave it three stars, unimpressed by the show's characters. Thea Lenarduzzi of The Independent, on the other hand, found the first episode gripping and full of excitement.

See also
The English, a 2022 British Western TV series

References

External links

ITV television dramas
2016 British television series debuts
2016 British television series endings
2010s British drama television series
2010s Western (genre) television series
Television series by ITV Studios
2010s British television miniseries
English-language television shows
Television shows set in Yorkshire